The Learning and Skills Act 2000 is an Act of the Parliament of the United Kingdom. It made changes in the funding and administration of further education, and of work-based learning (or apprenticeships) for young people, within England and Wales.

The main changes were:
 Establishment of the Learning and Skills Council (LSC) to secure the provision of education and training for young people and adults, in England, and to encourage employers and individuals to participate, and the LSC's funding powers.
 Provisions for the appointment of governors in the further education sector.
 Other duties and powers of the LSC, including equal opportunities and the needs of people with learning difficulties, powers to provide information, advice and guidance services and a duty to publish its strategy and annual plans.
 Establishment of local LSCs, including planning and consultation arrangements and the power of the Secretary of State to make directions to local education authorities in respect of adult and community learning provision.
 Creation of the LSC's Young People's and Adult Learning Committees. 
 Creation of academies (originally known as "city academies"), publicly funded schools operating outside of local government control and with a significant degree of autonomy.
 Powers for the Secretary of State to give directions to the LSC, to pay it its annual grant-in-aid and require the LSC to make an annual report.
 Similar arrangements for Wales.

The Act also established arrangements for Inspections of further education in England and Wales, and abolished the Further Education Funding Council for England.

External links
.

Acts of the Parliament of the United Kingdom concerning England and Wales
Career development in the United Kingdom
Educational administration
2000 in education
2000 in England
2000 in Wales
Education in England
Education in Wales
United Kingdom Acts of Parliament 2000
United Kingdom Education Acts
Vocational education in the United Kingdom
Youth employment